Maxwell Gratton is chief executive officer (CEO) of the Australian Flying Disc Association (AFDA).

Education
Gratton completed a Bachelor of Arts in sports administration at Victoria University in 2004. In 2012, he completed a Master of Business Administration, also at Victoria University, as well as being recognised as that year's ‘Most Outstanding MBA Student.’

Achievements
In 2007, Gratton commenced as Tribunal & Disciplinary Manager at Football Federation Victoria before becoming operations manager (special projects and discipline) from 2009 to 2014. In 2014, he spent five months working in management at ComfortDelGro Cabcharge, before being appointed CEO of Basketball A.C.T. In late 2016, he was appointed CEO of Football Federation Victoria. He departed the FFV on 31 October 2017.

On 8 November 2017, Gratton started his role as CEO of MQFF. He delivered record-breaking box-offices, the festival's largest ever attendance, the introduction of a Regional Roadshow, in addition to online offerings. He departed MQFF in August 2021.

On 16 August 2021, Gratton commenced as CEO of the Australian Flying Disc Association (AFDA). AFDA is recognised by Sport Australia as the National Sporting Organisation (NSO) for Flying Disc sports in Australia.

References

Living people
Australian chief executives
Australian sports executives and administrators
Year of birth missing (living people)